Kıbrıscık is a small town in Bolu Province of the Black Sea region of northwestern Turkey. It is the seat of Kıbrıscık District. Its population is 1,229 (2021). The mayor is Emin Tekemen (CHP).

The journey up to Kıbrıscık is attractive countryside reached on narrow forest roads under the trees, while the town itself is above the tree-line surrounded by rocky mountains. People visit the area to hike in the high meadows (yayla) on the flanks of the Köroğlu Mountains, including Köstenlik, Harmancık, Sinnecük Yaylasi (Kizilcaoren, Karacaoren), Sorudak, Issinler Kayasi, Nadas, Deveören (Tembeltepe) Yaylası at 2,200m. Other attractions include Karagöl lake, a deep crater lake, on the road to Beypazarı with forest all around; visitors come to walk, camp and watch the bird life on the lake. Other walks in the district take you to caves and interesting limestone rock formations.

The area is well inland from the Black Sea coast, behind high mountains, and has an inland climate, with a lot of rain in summer and autumn, and cold, hard winters with snow on the ground. Agriculture is a challenge on these rocky hillsides so the local economy depends on grazing sheep and cattle. A little rice is grown in places. This rice is very famous as Kıbrıscık Pirinci and the best rice comes from near Nadas Village where Koca Dayı lived. 

There are couple of famous faces from Kibriscik since history as Legendary Köroğlu, Çakaloglu Kara Mustafa, Ali Cavus, Deli Ibrehem, Yusuf Hoca, Gok Mehmet, Kocagoz, Aziz Aga and Deniz Sahin, ex-Turkish Windsurf Champion.

This was a village linked to the East Roman town of Bithynia (as Bolu and Galatia was then named) and which was brought under Ottoman Empire control at the same time as Bolu. The name comes from the river Kyberis (current Cuma Deresi near Deveoren and Nadas Villages).

References

External links
 Kıbrıscık municipality's official website
 Local information website

Populated places in Bolu Province
Towns in Turkey
Kıbrıscık District